Huang Ruifeng (born 10 November 1999) is a Chinese footballer currently playing as a midfielder for Shenzhen.

Career statistics

Club
.

References

1999 births
Living people
Chinese footballers
China youth international footballers
Association football midfielders
Chinese Super League players
Tianjin Tianhai F.C. players
Shenzhen F.C. players
Changchun Yatai F.C. players